Mohammadabad-e Kareyan (also Romanized as Moḩammadābād-e Kareyān and Moḩammadābād-e Karīān; also known as Kīriyān, Moḩammadābād, and Muhammadābād) is a village in Amirabad Rural District, Muchesh District, Kamyaran County, Kurdistan Province, Iran. At the 2006 census, its population was 336, in 77 families. The village is populated by Kurds.

References 

Towns and villages in Kamyaran County
Kurdish settlements in Kurdistan Province